Catch a Fire is a 2006 biographical thriller film about activists against apartheid in South Africa. The film was directed by Phillip Noyce, from a screenplay written by Shawn Slovo.  Slovo's father, Joe Slovo, and mother Ruth First, leaders of the South African Communist Party and activists in the Anti-Apartheid Movement, appear as characters in the film, while her sister, Robyn Slovo, is one of the film's producers and also plays their mother Ruth First. Catch a Fire was filmed on location in South Africa, Swaziland and Mozambique.

Plot
In South Africa in 1980, Patrick Chamusso, a young, apolitical man, is accused of carrying out a terrorist attack. Afrikaner police officer Nic Vos is in charge of locating the perpetrators of a recent bomb attack against the Secunda CTL synthetic fuel refinery, which is the largest coal liquefaction plant in the world.

Patrick is unwillingly swept into Vos's investigation due to his inability to provide a satisfactory explanation for his whereabouts at the time of the bombing (he was actually having an affair with a woman not his wife). Eventually Patrick, his wife, Precious, and his family are tortured by Vos and his subordinates. Desperate, Patrick says that he is willing to confess to a crime he did not commit to protect his family. Vos concludes that Patrick is innocent, and orders his release.

Fuelled by the anger at the injustices he and his family suffered, Patrick joins Umkhonto we Sizwe, the military wing of the ANC (the African National Congress, South Africa's anti-apartheid movement) and becomes exactly what Vos had initially accused him of being. He attempts to execute a plan to attack Secunda, the oil refinery he used to work for, by first bombing its adjacent water supply facilities, and 15 minutes later triggering the main explosion within the refinery itself. This would allow the refinery's workforce to flee between the two explosions, and not be harmed. Also, the damage of the first bomb would reduce the possibility of successfully extinguishing the fire caused by the second, main explosion. Patrick succeeds in the first part, but the second bomb is discovered by Vos and deactivated.

Patrick is arrested and sentenced to 24 years in prison, after his wife goes to Vos and tells him where Patrick is, because she fell for a simple trick in which Vos left photographs of Patrick talking to a female member of the ANC. Due to her unjustified jealousy, she sells him out. He is released early due to the abolition of apartheid.

Precious, who has remarried, is waiting for him and apologizes, and Patrick forgives her and says he is sorry as well. Some time later, he sees Vos sitting out near a small body of water. He creeps over and sees that it is indeed Vos, and though a part of him wants to break Vos' neck, he decides that it is not worth it. He left Vos alone, and went on to remarry and take in over 80 orphaned children in South Africa to provide a home for kids who lost their families during the anti-apartheid struggle.

Cast

Critical reception
The film received positive reviews from critics. Review aggregator Rotten Tomatoes reports that 75% out of 146 professional critics gave the film a positive review, with a rating average of 6.6/10 and the critical consensus being: "No stranger to the political thriller, director Phillip Noyce tackles apartheid and terrorism with experienced gusto, while Derek Luke and Tim Robbins hand in nuanced performances."

References

External links
 
 
 
 Catch a Fire Reviews at Metacritic.com
 Audio interview with director, Phillip Noyce, on the Afrikaans in Sydney podcast.

Apartheid films
Cold War films
2006 films
2006 thriller films
Films set in South Africa
Slovo family
Working Title Films films
Films directed by Phillip Noyce
British thriller films
American thriller films
2000s English-language films
English-language French films
English-language South African films
StudioCanal films
Films set in 1980
Films set in 1994
Films shot in South Africa
Films shot in Eswatini
French biographical films
South African biographical films
Films produced by Eric Fellner
Films produced by Tim Bevan
French thriller films
South African thriller films
2000s American films
2000s British films
2000s French films